Ilmari Richard Taipale (18 May 1928 in Tampere – 22 March 2008 in Porvoo) was a Finnish long-distance runner who competed in the 1952 Summer Olympics and in the 1956 Summer Olympics.

References

1928 births
2008 deaths
Finnish male long-distance runners
Olympic athletes of Finland
Athletes (track and field) at the 1952 Summer Olympics
Athletes (track and field) at the 1956 Summer Olympics
Sportspeople from Tampere
21st-century Finnish people
20th-century Finnish people